Ena Sendijarević (born 1987) is an Amsterdam-based Bosnian filmmaker and screenwriter. She is best known for her short film Import (2016) and her debut feature Take Me Somewhere Nice (2019). The latter won the Heart of Sarajevo award for Best Feature Film at the 2019 Sarajevo Film Festival.

Early life and education 

Sendijarević was born in 1987 in Odžak, Bosnia and Herzegovina. Later she moved with her family to Modriča, where she remained until the beginning of the Bosnian War. After moving 20 times, including to Berlin, she moved to Amsterdam in 2002. She studied media and culture at the University of Amsterdam and the Freie Universität Berlin. In 2014, she graduated with a degree in screenwriting and directing from the Netherlands Film Academy.

Career 

In 2013, Sendijarević  wrote and directed her first short film, Reizigers in de Nacht (Travellers in the Night). The film was selected for the VERS Award and won the VEVAM Go Short Award for Best Dutch Short at the Go Short International Short Film Festival 2014. She directed the short film Fernweh (2014), which premiered at the Palm Springs International Film Festival.

Sendijarević's 2016 short film, Import, premiered at the Cannes Directors' Fortnight. The film tells the story of a Bosnian refugee family in the Netherlands and its experience of integrating. It was selected as the official Dutch short film entrance for the 90th Academy Awards. 

Sendijarević's debut feature film, Take Me Somewhere Nice (2019), premiered in the Tiger Competition of the 48th International Film Festival Rotterdam, where it won a Special Jury Award for an extraordinary artistic achievement (a prize worth €10,000). The film is a coming-of-age story about a teenaged girl who travels to Bosnia to visit her ailing father in hospital. It won the prize for Best Feature Film at the Sarajevo Film Festival (the Heart of Sarajevo award) and at the Seoul International Women's Film Festival. It was reviewed in Variety as "a stylishly quirky debut feature".

Filmography 

Reizigers in de nacht (2013)
Fernweh (2014)
Import (2016)
Eng (2016, TV Mini-series, 1 episode - Space Girls)
 Take Me Somewhere Nice (2019)

References

External links 
 Import
 Ena Sendijarevic
 Take Me Somewhere Nice

1987 births
People from Odžak
Mass media people from Amsterdam
Dutch women film directors
Living people